Mount Hassage is a prominent isolated mountain,  high, located  southwest of Mount Horne in Palmer Land, Antarctica. The feature was discovered by the Ronne Antarctic Research Expedition (RARE) under Finn Ronne, and marks the southwestern extremity and turnabout point of the RARE plane flight of November 21, 1947. It was named by Ronne for Charles Hassage, ship's chief engineer on the expedition.

References

Mountains of Palmer Land